Ranking lists begin from 1 January 2018 to 31 January 2020. Continental qualification tournaments will also determine what athlete would compete in the Summer Paralympics.

The qualification slots are allocated to the NPC not to the individual athlete. However, if it is through the Bipartite Commission Invitation, the qualification slot is allocated to the individual athlete not to the NPC. 
 They can be obtained in either through the K44 or K43 World Ranking List. 
 An NPC can only allocated a maximum of six athletes (three male, three female) as long as they are on the world rankings list.
 An NPC can obtain slots through the Continental Qualifier Allocation with a maximum of four slots (two male, two female). The continental competitions are listed on the table below.
 An NPC can enter a maximum of one eligible athlete per medal event.
 K43 and K44 athletes are all competing together in one class.

Due to the COVID-19 pandemic, the Asian and European Qualification Tournaments were moved to different locations.

Timeline

Summary

Men's events

61 kg

75 kg

+75 kg

Women's events

49 kg

58 kg

+58 kg

References

Qualification